Central Karelia  is a subdivision of North Karelia and one of the Sub-regions of Finland since 2009.

Municipalities
 Kitee
 Rääkkylä
 Tohmajärvi

Politics
Results of the 2018 Finnish presidential election:

 Sauli Niinistö   63.8%
 Matti Vanhanen   10.1%
 Laura Huhtasaari   7.7%
 Paavo Väyrynen   7.4%
 Pekka Haavisto   5.1%
 Tuula Haatainen   4.0%
 Merja Kyllönen   1.6%
 Nils Torvalds   0.4%

Sub-regions of Finland
Geography of North Karelia